Percile is a  (municipality) in the Metropolitan City of Rome in the Italian region of Latium, located about  northeast of Rome.

References

External links
 Official website

Cities and towns in Lazio